Catch  These Vibes is the debut studio album by American rapper and singer PnB Rock. It was released on November 17, 2017, by Atlantic Records. It features guest appearances from Wiz Khalifa, Juicy J, Roy Woods and Smokepurpp, among others. It is preceded by two singles; "Feelins" and "Issues" featuring Russ.

Background
On September 20, 2017, the album's title and cover art was revealed by PnB Rock via Twitter. The album's tracklist and release date was revealed on October 27, 2017, along with the album's second single.

Singles
The album's lead single, "Feelins" was released on July 27, 2017. The album's second single, "Issues" featuring Russ was released on October 27, 2017.

On November 10, 2017, "Scrub" was released as a promotional single.

Promotion

Tour
On January 6, 2018, PnB Rock announced an official headlining concert tour to further promote the album titled Catch These Vibes Tour. The tour began on February 7, 2018, in New Haven, at Toad's Place. He was supported by rapper Lil Baby.

Track listing

Notes
 "Voicememowav.4" is stylized as "VOICEMEMOWAV.4"
 "WTS" features additional vocals by Semii
 "London" features additional vocals by LouGotCash

Sample credits
 "Feelins" contains a sample from "I Like It", written by Etterlene Jordan, William DeBarge and Eldra DeBarge, as performed by DeBarge.

Charts

Weekly charts

Year-end charts

References

2017 debut albums
PnB Rock albums
Atlantic Records albums
Albums produced by J.U.S.T.I.C.E. League
Albums produced by Jake One
Albums produced by London on da Track
Albums produced by Ronny J